The French Woman is a 1977 French drama film directed by Just Jaeckin and starring Françoise Fabian. The film is inspired by the life of French brothel madam Madame Claude.

Cast
 Françoise Fabian as Madame Claude
 Dayle Haddon as Elizabeth
 Murray Head as David Evans
 Klaus Kinski as Alexander Zakis
 Vibeke Knudsen as Anne-Marie
 Maurice Ronet as Pierre
 Robert Webber as Howard
 Jean Gaven as Gustave Lucas
 André Falcon as Paul
 François Perrot as Lefevre
 Marc Michel as Hugo
 Roland Bertin as Soulier
 Ed Bishop as Smith
 Karl Held as Stanfield

References

External links
 
 
 
 

1977 films
1977 drama films
French drama films
1970s French-language films
English-language French films
Films directed by Just Jaeckin
Films about prostitution in France
Films scored by Serge Gainsbourg
1970s French films